Chrysoesthia falkovitshi is a moth of the family Gelechiidae. It is found in Ukraine, Russia (southern Ural, Lower Volga) and Mongolia. The habitat consists of calcareous Artemisia steppes.

References

Moths described in 1989
Chrysoesthia